Baadshah is a 2013 Indian Telugu-language action comedy film directed by Sreenu Vaitla.  The film was produced by Bandla Ganesh under his Parameswara Art Productions banner. The film stars N. T. Rama Rao Jr. in the lead role, alongside Kajal Aggarwal, Navdeep, Brahmanandam, and Kelly Dorji. The soundtrack was composed by S. Thaman and this is his second collaboration with Sreenu Vaitla. Cinematography was handled by K. V. Guhan.

The film was released worldwide on 5 April 2013. and was premiered at the Osaka Asian Film Festival 2014 held in Japan. Baadshah released in 1550 Screens worldwide with 1200 Prints. Brahmanandam won the SIIMA Award for Best Comedian (Telugu) for his role in the film. Baadshah received positive reviews from critics for its performances of N. T. Rama Rao Jr. & Brahmanandam and humour. The film was a hit at the box office.

Plot
Sadhu Bhai is an international syndicate leader who conquered the underworld of entire southeast Asia, and no one dared to challenge him. Baadshah enters the underworld for his father Dhanraj. Sadhu's partner Crazy Robert captures Baadshah and Dhanraj. Baadshah defeats Robert's goons. However, he learns that both the Indian police led by ACP Aadi and IG Ramchandar and the Hong Kong police are out to catch him.

In Milan, Italy, Janaki is a social worker who lives with her uncle Pilli Gopi Krishna Simha and cousins Inky and Pinky. She meets Baadshah alias Rama Rao when he acts as if he is attempting suicide. Janaki introduces him to various people who attempted suicide but found hope for life through her inspiration. One such person is a poet named Dasu, who is actually a slacker. Rama Rao immediately discovers Dasu's true nature and buys him off to help him in making Janaki fall in love with him. 

Meanwhile, Ramchandar leads a police funeral for DIG Balram. Aadi and the police force think that Baadshah killed Balram, so Aadi vows to kill him. Meanwhile, Baadshah fights off Sadhu's henchman Rakhi Rasul, who comes looking for him. Unfortunately, one of Baadshah's right-hand men is killed by Robert when he refuses to give information about Baadshah. 

Flashback: Dhanraj runs a casino for Sadhu and runs a group of casino in Macau, where Sadhu's syndicate gets half of its entire income. Although Sadhu is the most powerful underworld don in Asia along with his right-hand men Vikram and Rasul, he was never able to conquer Hong Kong due to Robert's brother, a drug lord Violent Victor's and his son Ruthless Johnny's control. When Dhanraj attempts to transfer the money from the casino to Sadhu through Hong Kong, Johnny stops Dhanraj's henchmen and tries to steal the money. Baadshah then fends off Johnny's men. Sadhu asks Baadshah to recover his henchmen Antony, who was kidnapped by Victor. 

Unknown to Sadhu, it was Baadshah who kidnapped Antony. Baadshah demands control over Macau in return, to which Sadhu. Baadshah uses this as an opportunity to attack Johnny's place, recover several flood victim children (with whom Johnny planned to do illegal organ business), and kill Johnny. Baadshah then hands over Antony to Sadhu as if he had recovered him from Victor. Victor surrenders Hong Kong to Sadhu to seek his help in avenging his son's death. Sadhu, accepts the offer when he finds out that Baadshah was behind Antony's kidnap and played a game with him to get Macau. 

It is revealed that Baadshah's intent on entering the mafia world was to defeat Sadhu and conquer his empire with his uncle Ganesh. Sadhu sends his men to kill Baadshah, but Ganesh is killed instead. Baadshah kills Victor and his accomplices, and Sadhu joins forces with Robert. Meanwhile, Ramchandar finds out that Sadhu is shipping RDX from Hong Kong to India and sends a team headed by Balram and ACP Aadi to intercept the container. In Hong Kong, Balram and Aadi attack Sadhu's gang. However, Aadi betrays and brutally kills Balram, also revealing that he is the mole in the police department working with Sadhu. 

The container is successfully transported to India. Aadi makes sure that Baadshah is framed for Balram's murder. Robert then kidnaps Dhanraj and captures Baadshah. Baadshah finds out and reveals to Ramchandar about Aadi's betrayal. Ramachandar tells Baadshah that Janaki is engaged to Aadi and that they will be married in a few weeks. Gopi agrees to help Baadshah and Janaki. Janaki, Baadshah, Gopi, Inky, Pinky, and Dasu travel to India. 

Present: Meanwhile, Sadhu plans several bomb blasts in all major cities in India with the RDX on the day of the WSIS in Hyderabad. Baadshah enters Janaki's household by posing as wedding planner Rama Rao. Janaki's household is headed by her father Dr. Jaya Krishna Simha IPS, a strict and disciplined Commissioner of the IPS in Andhra Pradesh who expects all the men in the family to be disciplined police officers. 

However, Padmanabha Simha is lazy and becomes an inspector due to Jaya's influence. Aadi and his father arrive to Jaya's house for Aadi and Janaki's wedding. Rama Rao uses this as an opportunity to trap Aadi and reach Sadhu. When Rasul and Robert enter the city to carry out planned bomb blasts, Rama Rao goes with Padmanabha and kills Rasul. Padmanabha takes credit for the murder, and the police confiscate the RDX. Rama Rao's mother finds out that her son is Baadshah and becomes disgusted, though she later finds out from Ramchandar why he became Baadshah. 

Flashback: Before Rama Rao entered the mafia, he, along with his adoptive brother Siddhu and his mother were living happily. Sadly, on the day when Rama Rao was to leave for the US for software job, Siddhu was killed in a bomb blast that Sadhu planted. Rama Rao applies for a position in the IPS, but gets rejected by the whole department because Dhanraj was working under Sadhu, and no one with a criminal family history is allowed into the police department. 

Ramchandar asks Rama Rao to go undercover as Baadshah and infiltrate the mafia to extract information about Sadhu, and in return, all criminal charges against Dhanraj will be dropped. Rama Rao joins the syndicate as Baadshah to avenge Siddu's death. 

Present: After learning this, Rama Rao's mother apologizes for not trusting him, and he reunites her with a reformed Dhanraj. Later at the Sangeet ceremony, Aadi spikes the juice with alcohol (actually meant for Padmanabha so that he can reveal about Baadshah's identity), making everyone at the ceremony drunk. Jaya gets enraged and has a public dispute with Aadi and his father. Sadhu comes to Hyderabad and kills the police informer that notified the police of the RDX and Rasul's location. 

Sadhu then makes Aadi kidnap Ramchandar and capture Padmanabha. Padmanabha Simha soon finds out that he had been used by Baadshah. Aadi and Sadhu then attempt to leave India from an airport base, but Baadshah intervenes. Ramchandar reveals that Baadshah aka Rama Rao has been appointed as the new IGP and that he was hired when he recovered the RDX and proved his worth. Baadshah kills Sadhu and his goons as well as Robert and beats up and arrests Aadi and his father, thus ending Operation Baadshah. He then gets engaged to Janaki, and Jaya is happy that another police officer is becoming part of his household.

Cast

Production

Development 
While wrapping up the film Dookudu, Srinu Vaitla announced his next film with N. T. Rama Rao Jr. which would be produced by Bandla Ganesh on Parameswara Art Productions in July 2011. He further added that would take a gap of 2 months and then would start working for this film. The film was initially titled as Mafia with a tagline Manchi Kutumba Katha Chitram in the same month. But due to unknown reasons the film was officially titled as Baadshah, after considering the title Action in January 2012. It was reported earlier that N. T. Rama Rao Jr. allotted the dates from February and the film would be launched in the same month. However, the film was launched on 18 March 2012 in an event held at Ramanaidu Studios in Hyderabad. The event was attended by Telugu actors Ram Charan Teja and Venkatesh. The film also marked the last film of Srinu Vaitla with Kona Venkat as he had differences with him and it was confirmed by the duo that they would never team up again in the future.

Casting 
The Technical team along with the Music Director S. Thaman that delivered Dookudu worked for this film. N. T. Rama Rao Jr. gone lean to give a new look for his character in this film. It was also reported that N. T. Rama Rao Jr.'s character would have multiple shades in the film. Though the makers tried to rope Samantha initially, she couldn't be a part of the film due to her busy schedules. Finally the makers zeroed Kajal Aggarwal to play the lead lady's role in the film which marks her second collaboration with N. T. Rama Rao Jr. after Brindavanam. Popular actor Navdeep, who was known for his varied hero roles, was selected to play one of the antagonists of the film. Another popular Telugu, Tamil Hero Siddharth was hired to play a crucial cameo role of N. T. Rama Rao Jr.'s brother. Popular Actress Suhasini Maniratnam was signed in March 2013 to play the role of N. T. Rama Rao Jr.'s mother in the film. Mahesh Babu was reported to be the Narrator of a part of the film and after much speculation, the makers confirmed the news that Mahesh is providing Voice-over for some crucial scenes in the film. It was also revealed that Brahmanandam would play the role of a Cop in the film and his role was said to be very special in the film. Meenakshi Dixit and South African model Nicole Amy Madell were chosen to perform item numbers in the film.

Filming 

Though initially planned on 15 June 2012, the Principal photography started from 1 July 2012 at Milan in Italy after being shifted from Seoul. First schedule was initially said to be held in Europe. But the unit after shooting key portions at Italy shifted to Europe where two songs and some key scenes were shot. After filming for a hectic and long schedule in Europe and Italy, the unit proceeded to Bangkok. It was reported that some key scenes in Mafia Backdrop will be shot there. The film was shot extensively in Bangkok for more than 1 and a half month till 25 September 2012 and it was reported that 60% of the film's shoot was completed by then. The new shooting schedule of the film began in a private house in Hyderabad, where few comedy scenes and other vital scenes will be canned on the lead cast. The crew returned from Bangkok and the shooting resumed in Hyderabad from the last week of September 2012. The shooting later commenced at Novotel hotel in Hyderabad where scenes on N. T. Rama Rao Jr., Mukesh Rishi and others were canned. The filming resumed in Hyderabad from the second week of October 2012. In the same month, the Introduction fight of N. T. Rama Rao Jr. was filmed at a huge set erected at the Aluminium Factory in Gachibowli under the supervision of Vijayan. After filming a few other action sequences, the unit continued its shoot in Hyderabad in November 2012 where some key scenes were shot on the lead pair as well as other actors. In December, the shoot continued at Rajiv Gandhi International Airport at Shamshabad in Hyderabad for 3 days. In the same month, Navdeep joined the sets of the film. Later the shooting continued at a temple in Kachiguda and Daspalla Hotel in Hyderabad. The climax of the film was shot at Nagarjuna Sagar in which N. T. Rama Rao Jr., Navdeep, Kelly Dorje and others participated for a week. Then a song on Nicole and N. T. Rama Rao Jr. was filmed at Annapurna 7 Acres Studio. After completing few patch work activities at Novotel, the shooting finally came to an end on 15 March 2013.

Music

The soundtrack of the film was composed by S. Thaman, who previously worked with both N. T. Rama Rao Jr. and Srinu Vaitla. Music discussions were held in Ooty. The soundtrack consists of 6 Tracks all composed by S. Thaman with Ramajogayya Sastry penning 3 of them and Krishna Chaitanya, Viswa, Bhaskarabhatla Ravikumar penning each. The audio launch of the film was held at Ramanaidu Studios in Nanakramguda, Hyderabad on 27 February 2013 and the audio was released through Aditya Music label. The audio was a huge success and The Hexa Platinum Disc function of the film was held on 9 March 2013 at Novotel in Hyderabad.

Release 
Venkat Garikapati and G. Hari Kumar of Hari Venkateswara Films obtained the distribution rights of this film for Guntur and Nellore rights were acquired by Sri Nikethan Films. Bharath Pictures took the distribution rights of this film for Visakhapatnam at a record price of 41.0 million. The film obtained a U/A Certificate from the CBFC and was released on 5 April 2013. Benefit show tickets hungama for the film was started from 2 April 2013. The film was released in a record number of theaters in the US.

Reception

Critical reception 
The Times of India gave a review stating "Baadshah is a treat for N. T. Rama Rao Jr. fans, others can also enjoy this film for its comedy elements and N. T. Rama Rao Jr.'s powerful presence." Idlebrain gave a review of rating 4.5/5 stating "Baadshah is a film that serves you with Seenu Vytla kind of entertainment using N. T. Rama Rao Jr. and Brahmanandam in an effective way. N. T. Rama Rao Jr. has got a film with excellent box office potential after a long gap. It's up to the star power of N. T. Rama Rao Jr. and brand value of Seenu Vytla to take it further." 123telugu gave a review stating "Baadshah is a very effective entertainer for the summer holidays. Brilliant performances from N. T. Rama Rao Jr., Kajal, Brahmanandam and M.S.Narayana coupled with a highly entertaining second half are major plus points for the film. Different from similarities to Sreenu Vaitla's past projects, the film makes for a very enjoyable watch. Catch Baadshah this weekend. Entertainment, action and suspense is guaranteed!" Oneindia Entertainment gave a review of rating 5/5 stating "Baadshah is a good masala entertainer, which has excellent performance by lead actors and sound production values. The movie impresses all kinds of audience. It is a treat for N. T. Rama Rao Jr. fans. Don't miss to watch the Young Tiger in action." SuperGoodMovies gave a review of rating 4/5 stating "N. T. Rama Rao Jr., Kajal's Baadshah is a successful entertainer for this summer. Sparkling performances from all the actors with a very much entertaining film. Sreenu Vaitla's proved with almost all projects. Complete Entertainment is assured."

Box office
Being the biggest outing of NTR after two flops with, Sakthi, Dammu, expectations were very high among the audience on this film. This film was opened to great start, collecting 33 cr (share) all over the world at the end of 1st week, thus emerging as the highest opening grosser of N. T. Rama Rao Jr.'s career and got a cult status. It is also the 7th consecutive blockbuster of Sreenu Vaitla. The film has collected 9.3 million (net) in the first week worldwide. The film has collected 427.1 million (net) in three weeks worldwide. The film has collected 920 million (net) worldwide. The film collected a total share WW of 48.50 crores. It was one of the highest-grossing films in NTR career.

India 
The film opened to tremendous response in all the Major Cities of India in which it was released and the entire shows in major cities have been sold out for the next three days from the day of release. On the first day, the film has registered 100% occupancy in both single screens and multiplexes. The film had huge amount of advance ticket booking and remaining few tickets were sold out early in the morning. The film has collected 560.2 million (net) in 40 days in Andhra Pradesh. The film has completed 50 days in 60 centres in Andhra Pradesh on 24 May 2013. The film has completed 100 days in 5 centres in Andhra Pradesh on 13 July 2013.

Overseas 
The film was in the list of top 10 grossers at USA box office on 4 April 2013 collecting 234,686 USD's in 108 reported screens across USA, thus emerging as the biggest grosser among N. T. Rama Rao Jr.'s movies in USA, thus breaking the record set by Seethamma Vakitlo Sirimalle Chettu which held the record of all-time highest grosser Telugu movie in the country. Noted trade analyst Taran Adarsh has reported that the film crossed the US$1 Million mark in the US, on the third day, which is a phenomenal feat and it is the first Telugu film to achieve this record in the opening weekend itself. The film collected 1.094 Million Dollars.

Home media
The VCD's, DVD's & Blu-ray's of the film were released through the Company BhavaniDVD on 19 July 2013. Maxam released the original Telugu version with Japanese subtitles on DVD on December 19, 2014, and was later reissued at a lower price on March 31, 2017. It was also released on YouTube by Volga Video since 2014.

References

External links 
 

2013 films
2010s action comedy-drama films
Films shot in Italy
Films shot in Switzerland
Indian films about revenge
2013 masala films
Films directed by Srinu Vaitla
Films scored by Thaman S
Films with screenplays by Kona Venkat
Films shot in Thailand
Films shot in Spain
Films shot at Ramoji Film City
Films shot in Hyderabad, India
Indian action comedy-drama films
Indian gangster films
2010s Telugu-language films